Leo Kulinczenko is an American/Ukrainian association football player who played professionally in the CONCACAF Champions League (CONCACAF Champions Cup) and the Lamar Hunt U.S Open Cup (National Challenge Cup). He played in the American Soccer League the North American Soccer League the National Soccer League (Chicago) and the Greater Los Angeles Soccer League.

Youth career
Kulinczenko who is of Ukrainian descent started his playing career in the youth system of the Ukrainian Lions.

Professional career
In 1974 he began his career with the 1st team of the Ukrainian Lions. In 1976 he was invited to the Chicago Sting of the  North American Soccer League training squad but then was released after 3 months. He played for 5 time US Open Cup winners Maccabee Los Angeles in 1977 and 1978 winning the Lamar Hunt US Open Cup (National Challenge Cup).
In 1979 he played for the Los Angeles Skyhawks of the American Soccer League. His first game with the Skyhawks was a friendly against the 1980 US Olympic team the game was played in Los Angeles Jackie Robinson Stadium. In 1980 he returned to play with the Ukrainian Lions until 1983. In 1984 he played for U.S. Open Cup finalist Chicago Croatian in the 1985 CONCACAF Champions League (CONCACAF Champions Cup) against Honduras champion Club Deportivo Olimpia. He retired after the 1985 season.

Coaching career
He held a full-time position with the highly competitive Chicago Sockers as a staff coach for 16 years. The Chicago Sockers is a nationally recognized youth soccer program it is the only program in Illinois to provide the U.S. Soccer Development Academy for the boys and girls the highest competition platforms in the U.S. In 2007 and 2008 he was director for the twelve to fourteen year-old age group at Chicago Eclipse Select which was part of the Elite Clubs National League. 1998-2000 he coached the boys varsity team at Saint Viator High School. 2001 he was assistant men's coach at North Central College.

References

External files

Living people
1954 births
Sportspeople from Chicago
Soccer players from Chicago
American soccer players
Los Angeles Skyhawks players
Ukrainian Lions players
National Soccer League (Chicago) players
American people of Ukrainian descent
Association football defenders
American Soccer League (1933–1983) players
American soccer coaches
College men's soccer coaches in the United States
North Central Cardinals men's soccer coaches
CONCACAF Champions' Cup